Atlético Clube Paranavaí, usually known simply as Paranavaí, is a Brazilian football team from the city of Paranavaí, Paraná state, founded on March 14, 1946.

History
On March 14, 1946, Atlético Clube Paranavaí was founded. In 1967, the club won its first title, which was the Campeonato Paranaense Second Level.

In 2007, Paranavaí won the state championship, after they beat Paraná in the final. In the same year, the club competed in Campeonato Brasileiro Série C, and was eliminated in the first stage of the competition.

Players

Current squad

Titles
 Campeonato Paranaense (1): 2007
 Campeonato Paranaense Second Level (3): 1967, 1983, 1992

References

External links
 Atlético Clube Paranavaí
 Atlético Clube Paranavaí at Arquivo de Clubes 

 
Paranavai
Paranavai
1946 establishments in Brazil
Paranavaí